The Chuping Archaeological Site is an archaeological site in Ren'ai Township, Nantou County, Taiwan. It houses relics of the first prehistoric mountain settlements in Taiwan.

History
The site was discovered in 1980 in the upper area of Zhuoshui River valley. In 1981–1987, three excavations were done to the site. Later on, the site was covered back as a protective measure until one day the site will be transformed into an education exhibition site. On 14 May 2019, the Ministry of Culture declared the site as Taiwan's 10th national archaeological site.

Geology
The site is located at an altitude of 750 meters.

See also
 Prehistory of Taiwan

References

1980 archaeological discoveries
Archaeological sites in Taiwan
Buildings and structures in Nantou County